Drummie is the name of:

 Drummie Zeb (born 1959), British musician
 Richard Drummie (born 1959), British musician
 Sheena Drummie, Scottish curler

See also
 Drummie awards; see DRUM!